Flemming Vögg (12 September 1914 – 21 February 1991) was a Danish fencer. He competed in the team foil event at the 1948 Summer Olympics.

References

External links
 

1914 births
1991 deaths
Danish male foil fencers
Olympic fencers of Denmark
Fencers at the 1948 Summer Olympics
People from Helsingør
Sportspeople from the Capital Region of Denmark